Dorothy Whipple (née Stirrup) (26 February 1893 – 14 September 1966) was an English writer of popular fiction and children's books. Her work gained popularity between the world wars and again in the 2000s.

Personal life
Dorothy Stirrup was born in Blackburn, Lancashire, and had a happy childhood as one of several children of Walter Stirrup (a local architect) and his wife Ada Cunliffe.  Her close friend George Owen was killed the first week of the war.  She worked for three years as a secretary to Henry Whipple (a widowed educational administrator 24 years her senior), and married him in 1917. Their life together was mostly spent in Nottingham. She returned to Blackburn after his death in 1958 and died there in 1966.

Overview
Described as the "Jane Austen of the 20th Century" by J. B. Priestley, her work enjoyed a period of great popularity between the wars, two of her novels being made into feature films, They Were Sisters (1945) and They Knew Mr. Knight (1946).

While the popularity of Whipple's work declined in the 1950s, it revived in the 2000s, when six novels were republished by Persephone Books. A volume of her collected short stories appeared in October 2007. Five of these were broadcast as The Afternoon Reading on BBC Radio 4. By April 2019, ten of the 132 books published by Persephone Books were written by Whipple.

Bibliography
Young Anne (1927), republished 2018
High Wages (1930), republished 2009
Greenbanks (1932), republished 2011
They Knew Mr. Knight (1934), republished  2000
On Approval, (1935)
The Priory (1939), republished 2003
After Tea, and Other Stories (1942)
They Were Sisters (1943), republished 2005
Every Good Deed (1946)
Because Of The Lockwoods (1949), republished 2014
The Other Day: An Autobiography (1950)
Someone at a Distance (1953), republished 1999
Wednesday and Other Stories (1961)
Tale of Very Little Tortoise (1962)
The Smallest Tortoise of All (1964)
Little Hedgehog (1965)
Random Commentary: Books And Journals Kept from 1925 Onwards (1966)
Mrs. Puss and That Kitten (1967)
The Closed Door and other stories (2007)

References

External links

Persephone Books website for Dorothy Whipple
Oxford Dictionary for National Biography entry for Dorothy Whipple
Blackburn Museum website entry for Dorothy Whipple

1893 births
1966 deaths
People from Blackburn
20th-century English novelists